St. Manchan's Oratory, also called An Teampall Geal ("the bright church") is a medieval oratory and National Monument in County Kerry, Ireland.

Location

Description

Church
A boat-shaped oratory similar to that at Gallarus. A souterrain (called Poll na Sagart, the priest's hole, based on the common legends that Catholic priests hid in them in the Penal era) and ancient burial ground with cross-inscribed slabs lie nearby. A holy well, Tobermanaghan, lies to the south.

Ogham stone

The ogham stone (CIIC 170) stands  and reads QENỊLOCI MAQI MAQI-AINIA MUC̣[OI] ("of Cellach, son of the son of Ania, of the tribe of ..."). Sabine Ziegler placed it in the 5th–7th centuries AD.

References

Religion in County Kerry
Archaeological sites in County Kerry
National Monuments in County Kerry
Former churches in the Republic of Ireland